Ole Jonsen Hindrum was a Norwegian builder and architect. He was a noted church builder in Trøndelag county, particularly specializing in the rare and unique Y-shaped floor plan.

Ole Jonsen Hindrum was born around the year 1625 in Hindrem in Leksvik municipality in Trøndelag county, Norway. He was active as a church builder during the second half of the 17th century and thus built or participated in the construction of a number of church buildings in Trøndelag. He was also involved in repairs to the spire of the Nidaros Cathedral in 1686, 1687, and 1690.

Works
 1649: Oppdal Church
 1651: Meldal Church (burned down in 1981, a copy rebuilt in 1988)
 1653: Hindrum Church (torn down in 1895)
 1654: Vuku Church
 1667: Leksvik Church
 1669: Rennebu Church (Y-shape)
 1670: Horg Church (Y-shape; torn down in 1894)
 1673: Leinstrand Church
 1696: Tydal Church (Y-shape)

References

1620s births
Year of death missing
17th-century Norwegian architects
Norwegian ecclesiastical architects